The Superior Court of California, County of Trinity, also known as the Trinity County Superior Court, is the branch of the California superior court with jurisdiction over Trinity County.

History
Trinity County was one of the original counties formed when California gained statehood in 1850.

The first courthouse was completed in 1853 as a three-storey wooden building at the intersection of Court and Church streets in the county seat of Weaverville. The third storey was purchased by the Trinity Masonic Lodge for US$500. The 1853 Weaverville courthouse was condemned in an 1860 grand jury report, which found that "bed bugs had invaded the offices of the sheriff and the clerk, had defiled the records, and had even attacked a judge on the bench", prompting local officials to move.

Court operations moved into a newer brick building, shortly after it was purchased in 1865; the building formerly housed the Apollo Saloon and hotel. The 1853 courthouse was destroyed in a September 1866 fire. The brick building purchased in 1865 was built originally in 1856–57 for Henry Hocker as a saloon, store, and office building. It is the second oldest courthouse still being used by a county-level California Superior Court; the oldest is the 1854 courthouse used by the Mariposa County Superior Court.

Venues

In addition to the historic Weaverville courthouse, which was added to the National Register of Historic Places as part of the Weaverville Historic District in 1971, Trinity County Superior Court also holds regularly scheduled sessions at the county sheriff's substation in Hayfork and at the Community Center dining hall in Mad River. However, all jury trials are conducted in Weaverville.

References

External links
 
 

Superior Court
Superior courts in California